Liepājas Arodnieks ('Liepāja Trade Unionist') was a weekly newspaper published from Liepāja, Latvia in 1919. It was founded as a replacement for Darba, a publication that had been banned. Politically the newspaper opposed the Kārlis Ulmanis government. E. Tomsona served as editor of the newspaper. However, albeit different editors were named in the newspaper the editorial control over the newspaper was managed by the Liepāja City Committee of the Communist Party of Latvia; Jānis Jurjāns, Anna Pērle and Janis Vītols ('Pakalnītis'). The first issue of the newspaper was published on January 28, 1919.

The publication of Liepājas Arodnieks was irregular. The government closed it down after its third issue (published on February 4, 1919). A fourth issue was published on March 17, 1919. Publication was again resumed on June 15, 1919. It did not appear during the Liepāja typesetters' strike of July 15–24, 1919. It was again shut down by the government on September 24, 1919.

References

Publications established in 1919
Publications disestablished in 1919
Communist newspapers
Newspapers published in Latvia
Latvian-language newspapers